Alfred Mendelsohn (17 February 1910 – 9 May 1966) was a Romanian composer.

Mendelsohn studied from 1927 to 1931 at the Music Academy in Vienna with Joseph Marx and Franz Schmidt and the Conservatory in Bucharest at Mihail Jora. From 1944 to 1963 he was conductor at the Romanian National Opera, 1949, he taught as professor of counterpoint at the Conservatory.

He composed several operas and ballets, eight symphonies and a dramatic symphony in seven scenes, a symphonic poem, a string suite, a cello concerto, two violin concertos, two piano concertos, chamber works, oratorios, cantatas, drama and film music, choral works and songs.

Selected Compositions
Stage
 Imnul iubirii (Love Anthem), opera (1946); libretto after Ivan Turgenev
 Harap Alb (The White Moor of Alexandru Jar by Ion Creanga), ballet (1948)
 Meşterul Manole (Master Manole), opera (1949); after a popular legend
 Călin, ballet (1956); choreography by Tildei Urseanu to Mihail Eminescu Urseanu
 Anton Pann, operetta (1961); libretto by Ion Roman and Radu Albala
 Michelangelo, opera (1964); libretto by the composer after Alexandru Kiriţescu
 Spinoza, opera (1966); libretto by Paul Sterian
 Cântec pentru Stalin (Song for Stalin), ode (1950)
 Glasul lui Lenin (Lenin's voice), cantata (1957)

Concertante
 Concerto for viola and orchestra (1965)

Chamber music
 Petite Suite for viola solo (1933)
 Suite for cello solo (1960)
 Partita (Prelude and Fugue) for violin solo

References

1910 births
1966 deaths
Musicians from Bucharest
Romanian classical composers
Romanian Jews
Jewish classical composers
Pupils of Joseph Marx
20th-century classical composers
Male classical composers
20th-century male musicians